Pyrrolizidine alkaloids (PAs), sometimes referred to as necine bases, are a group of naturally occurring alkaloids based on the structure of pyrrolizidine.  Pyrrolizidine alkaloids  are produced by plants as a defense mechanism against insect herbivores. More than 660 PAs and PA N-oxides have been identified in over 6,000 plants, and about half of them exhibit hepatotoxicity. They are found frequently in plants in the Boraginaceae, Asteraceae, Orchidaceae and Fabaceae families; less frequently in the Convolvulaceae and Poaceae, and in at least one species in the Lamiaceae.
It has been estimated that 3% of the world’s flowering plants contain pyrrolizidine alkaloids.  Honey can contain pyrrolizidine alkaloids, as can grains, milk, offal and eggs.  To date (2011), there is no international regulation of PAs in food, unlike those for herbs and medicines.

Unsaturated pyrrolizidine alkaloids are hepatotoxic, that is, damaging to the liver. PAs also cause hepatic veno-occlusive disease and liver cancer. PAs are tumorigenic.  Disease associated with consumption of PAs is known as pyrrolizidine alkaloidosis.

Of concern is the health risk associated with the use of medicinal herbs that contain PAs, notably borage leaf, comfrey and coltsfoot in the West, and some Chinese medicinal herbs.

Some ruminant animals, for example cattle, show no change in liver enzyme activities or any clinical signs of poisoning when fed low concentrations of plants containing pyrrolizidine alkaloids.  Yet, Australian studies have demonstrated toxicity. Sheep and goats especially, and to a lesser degree cattle, are much more resistant and tolerate much higher PA dosages, thought to be due to thorough detoxification via PA-destroying rumen microbes. Males react more sensitively than females, fetuses, and children.

PA is also used as a defense mechanism by some organisms such as Utetheisa ornatrix. Utetheisa ornatrix caterpillars obtain these toxins from their food plants and use them as a deterrent for predators. PAs protect them from most of their natural enemies. The toxins stay in these organisms even when they metamorphose into adult moths, continuing to protect them throughout their adult stage.

Ecology

Many plants contain pyrrolizidine alkaloids, and in turn there are many insects which consume the plants and build up the alkaloids in their bodies. For example, male queen butterflies utilize pyrrolizidine alkaloids to produce pheromones useful for mating. The butterfly Danaus chrysippus is known to obtain pyrrolizidine alkaloids in their diet and store these chemicals, making them toxic and unpalatable to predators. Greta oto, the glasswing butterfly, uses pyrrolizidine alkaloids for both toxicity in the adult moth and pheromone production in the male butterfly. The garden tiger moth also stores these compounds as a caterpillar, using them for larval (through the use of spines) and adult defense (in the form of a spray and bad taste).

Plants species containing pyrrolizidine alkaloids

 Adenostyles alliariae
 Adenostyles glabra
 Ageratum conyzoides
 Ageratum houstonianum
 Anchusa officinalis
 Arnebia euchroma
 Borago officinalis (< 10 ppm, non-toxic)
 Cacalia hastata
 Cacalia hupehensis
 Chromolaena odorata
 Cordia myxa
 Crassocephalum crepidioides
 Crotalaria albida
 Crotalaria assamica
 Crotalaria crispat
 Crotalaria dura
 Crotalaria globifera
 Crotalaria mucronata
 Crotalaria sesseliflora
 Crotalaria spectabilis
 Crotalaria tetragona
 Crotalaria retusa
 Cynoglossum amabile
 Cynoglossum lanceolatum
 Cynoglossum officinale
 Cynoglossum zeylanicum
 Echium plantagineum
 Echium vulgare
 Emilia sonchifolia
 Eupatorium cannabinum
 Eupatorium chinense
 Eupatorium fortunei
 Eupatorium japonicum
 Eupatorium perfoliatum 
 Eupatorium purpureum
 Farfugium japonicum
 Gynura bicolor
 Gynura divaricata
 Gynura segetum
 Heliotropium amplexicaule
 Heliotropium europaeum
 Heliotropium indicum
 Heliotropium popovii
 Lappula intermedia
 Ligularia cymbulifera
 Ligularia dentata
 Ligularia duiformis
 Ligularia heterophylla
 Ligularia hodgsonii
 Ligularia intermedia
 Ligularia lapathifolia
 Ligularia lidjiangensis
 Ligularia platyglossa
 Ligularia tongolensis
 Ligularia tsanchanensis
 Ligularia vellerea
 Liparis nervosa
 Lithospermum erythrorhizon
 Neurolaena lobata
 Petasites japonicus
 Senecio alpinus
 Senecio argunensis
 Senecio brasiliensis
 Senecio chrysanthemoides
 Senecio cineraria
 Senecio glabellus
 Senecio integrifolius var. fauriri
 Senecio interggerrimus
 Senecio jacobaea
 Senecio lautus
 Senecio linearifolius
 Senecio madagascariensis
 Senecio nemorensis
 Senecio quadridentatus
 Senecio riddelli
 Senecio scandens
 Senecio vulgaris
 Syneilesis aconitifolia
 Symphytum officinale
 Tussilago farfara

The effect of PAs in humans, that is PAILDs (Pyrrolizidine Alkaloid Induced Liver Diseases), of epidemic proportions was recorded after a long field-level epidemiological investigation in the northern region of Ethiopia-Tigray.

Classification
One classification is based on the substitution pattern of the pyrrolizidine ring. This part of the structure is normally referred to as necine bases. The three largest groups are based on the three necine bases platynecine, heliotridine and retronecine.

References

External links

Retronecine at KEGG
msn.com/de News Report: Well-known brands affected: This is how much poison there is in these herbal and chamomile teas. 6 out of 13 brands of herbal tea available in Germany contain the poison.

Plant toxins
 
Hepatotoxins